Tactusa dohertyi is a moth of the family Erebidae first described by Michael Fibiger in 2010. It is known from Java.

The wingspan is about 10 mm. The ground colour of the forewing is light brown, suffused with brown scales, with an acutely angled blackish patch in the upper medial area and a dark brown subterminal area, a blackish patch between the reniform stigma and fringes and five black dots, including that by the apex, between the medial quadrangular patch and the apex. Only the terminal line is marked by interneural black spots. The hindwing is dark grey, with a very faint discal spot and the underside is unicolorous grey.

References

Micronoctuini
Taxa named by Michael Fibiger
Moths described in 2010